Ralph Katz (born 1957) is an American bridge player. Katz is from Burr Ridge, Illinois and graduated from University of Steubenville.

In 2018 he was a first-ballot selection for the ACBL Hall of Fame.

Domestically, he has won 23 North American Bridge Championships and the Open Team Trials seven times. Internationally, he has many top finishes, highlighted by a win in the 2009 Bermuda Bowl. He has three times been the runner-up in world championships (the 2010 Rosenblum Cup, the 2007 Bermuda Bowl and the 1990 World Open Pairs Championship) and also has a bronze medal from the 2000 World Bridge Teams Olympiad. Katz is a Grand Life Master of the American Contract Bridge League with over 27,000 masterpoints and a World Grand Master of the World Bridge Federation.

Katz, who was born in Pittsburgh, lived in Squirrel Hill (a large residential neighborhood in the east end of Pittsburgh) and was raised in Steubenville, first started to play bridge when he was 16. A sports enthusiast, the competitive side of bridge drew Katz to the game.

Katz's wife, Martha, is a former World Junior Teams champion (then known as Martha Benson). Both she and their son, Sam, are former winners of ACBL King or Queen of Bridge award.

Bridge accomplishments

Awards
 ACBL Player of the Year 2001
 Fishbein Trophy 1981, 2001

Wins
 Bermuda Bowl (1) 2009
 North American Bridge Championships (25)
Vanderbilt (5) 1999, 2004, 2009, 2014, 2017
 Spingold (3) 1981, 2001, 2002
 Reisinger (2) 2000, 2009, 2021
 Open Board-a-Match Teams (3) 2002, 2003, 2006
 Jacoby Open Swiss Teams (1) 2001
 North American Men's Swiss Teams (1) 1984
 Master Mixed Teams (1) 1981
 Life Master Pairs (2) 1979, 2022
 Life Master Open Pairs (1) 2008
 Open Pairs (1) 1986
 Open Pairs I (2) 1996, 2003
 IMP Pairs (1) 1999
Baze Senior KO (1) 2016
 United States Bridge Championships (7)
Open Team Trials (7) 2000, 2006, 2007, 2012, 2014, 2017 and 2018

Runners-up
 Rosenblum Cup (1) 2010
 Bermuda Bowl (1) 2007
 World Open Pairs (1) 1990
 North American Bridge Championships (17)
Reisinger (6) 1987, 1995, 1998, 2001, 2005, 2014
 Grand National Teams (1) 1986
 Open Board-a-Match Teams (2) 2001, 2012
 North American Swiss Teams (1) 1979
 Open Swiss Teams (3) 2008, 2015, 2018
 Mixed Board-a-Match (1) 1997
 Life Master Pairs (4) 1989, 2001, 2003, 2016
 IMP Pairs (1) 2006
Baze Senior KO (1) 2017
Vanderbilt (3) 2012, 2018, 2019
 United States Bridge Championships (2)
 Open Team Trials (2) 1989, 1999

References

External links
 
 

1957 births
American contract bridge players
Bermuda Bowl players
Living people
Date of birth missing (living people)
Franciscan University of Steubenville alumni
People from Burr Ridge, Illinois
People from Pittsburgh